Ernest Thomas Watkins (3 April 1898 – 10 October 1976) was an English professional footballer who scored 87 goals from 202 appearances in the Football League playing for Birmingham, Southend United, Brentford, Millwall, Fulham, Gillingham and Charlton Athletic.

Playing career
Watkins was born in Finchley, which was then part of Middlesex. He began his playing career in local football with Barnet and Finchley before joining Birmingham in October 1922. He went straight into the starting XI for his debut in the First Division on 4 November in a goalless draw at home to Cardiff City. He scored in the return fixture the following week, and kept his place for a few more games before dropping to the reserves. After that he played only twice more for the first team, standing in for the unavailable Jackie Whitehouse, then returned to the south-east of England in February 1924 to join Southend United.

Watkins scored at a rate of a goal every other game for Southend, with 17 goals from 34 games in all competitions, including 15 from 32 in the Third Division South, but late in 1925 he was required to play for the reserves. He scored four goals as Southend beat Chelsea reserves 5–1 in the London Combination on New Year's Eve, but a "breach of club rules" occurring later that day brought the player a two-week suspension and a place on the transfer list. A few days later he signed for fellow Third Division club Brentford in a £1000 transfer, at the time the club's record fee paid.

Described as "a goal poacher whose best work was done inside the area", Watkins was Brentford's leading scorer in both the 1926–27 and 1928–29 seasons (becoming the first Bees player to hit 20 league goals in a season) and, lay eighth in the club's all-time scorers list with 59 goals from 130 appearances. In February 1930 he joined Millwall of the Second Division, and then completed his tour of London- and Kent-based Third Division clubs which took in spells with Fulham, Gillingham and Charlton Athletic. In February 1932, while a Charlton player, he sustained a knee injury which forced his retirement from the game at the end of the 1931–32 season.

Watkins died in his native Finchley on 10 October 1976 at the age of 78.

Career statistics

Honours 
Brentford
 London Charity Fund: 1928

References

1898 births
1976 deaths
Footballers from Finchley
English footballers
Association football forwards
Barnet F.C. players
Finchley F.C. players
Birmingham City F.C. players
Southend United F.C. players
Brentford F.C. players
Millwall F.C. players
Fulham F.C. players
Gillingham F.C. players
Charlton Athletic F.C. players
English Football League players